Goodeinae is a subfamily of splitfins from Mexico, part of the family Goodeidae. They are small fish which mostly live in fresh water, especially around Mesa Central, west of Mexico City. Members of the subfamily are also found in brackish water on both the east and west coasts. They typically have small ranges and many are seriously threatened (some already extinct). The subfamily takes its name from its type genus Goodea and so is ultimately named after the American ichthyologist George Brown Goode (1851-1896).

Genera
The following genera make up the subfamily Goodeinae:

 Allodontichthys C. L. Hubbs & C. L. Turner, 1939
 Alloophorus Hubbs & Turner, 1939
 Allotoca Hubbs & Turner, 1939
 Ameca  R. R. Miller & Fitzsimons, 1971
 Ataeniobius Hubbs & Turner, 1939
 Chapalichthys Hubbs, 1926
 Characodon Günther, 1866
 Girardinichthys Bleeker, 1860
 Goodea Jordan, 1880
 Hubbsina de Buen, 1940
 Ilyodon Eigenmann, 1907
 Skiffia Meek 1902
 Xenoophorus Hubbs & Turner, 1939
 Xenotaenia Turner, 1946
 Xenotoca Hubbs & Turner, 1939
 Zoogoneticus Meek, 1902

References

External links

  Goodeinae - goodeidae.us

 
Goodeidae
Ray-finned fish subfamilies
Taxa named by David Starr Jordan